Duffy Square, named Father Duffy Square in 1939, is the northern triangle of Times Square in Manhattan, New York City.  It is bounded by 45th and 47th Streets, Broadway and Seventh Avenue. It is now well known for the TKTS reduced-price theater tickets booth located there.

In the 18th and 19th centuries Lowes Lane connected Bloomingdale Road to Eastern Post Road.  The west end of the lane was at the modern Duffy Square, and the east end at approximately the modern Third Avenue and 42nd Street.  Lowes Lane and Eastern Post Road were suppressed late in the 19th century, but Bloomingdale Road survives under the name of Broadway.

Duffy Square was briefly dominated by a fifty-foot, eight-ton plaster statue entitled Purity (Defeat of Slander) by Leo Lentelli in 1909.  Now the square has two statues: a bronze statue of Chaplain Francis P. Duffy of New York's "Fighting 69th" Infantry Regiment, after whom the square is named, sculpted by Charles Keck, and another statue depicting composer, playwright, producer and actor George M. Cohan, by sculptor Georg J. Lober. The statue of Duffy was dedicated by Mayor Fiorello LaGuardia on May 2, 1937, who also signed the law authorizing the renaming of the square to "Father Duffy Square" on March 29, 1939; on June 13 of that year, the street signs were changed. The statue of Duffy and the square itself were listed on the National Register of Historic Places in 2001.

Gallery

References

External links

 The Fighting 69th Regiment Homepage
 Times Square Alliance
 NYC Parks

Buildings and structures on the National Register of Historic Places in Manhattan
National Register of Historic Places in New York City
Squares in Manhattan
Times Square